The Egypt men's national volleyball team represents Egypt in international volleyball competitions and friendly matches. The team is one of the leading nations in men's volleyball on the African continent, alongside Tunisia. Egypt are eighth winners of the African Championships (1976, 1983, 2005, 2007, 2009, 2011, 2013, 2015).

Results

Olympic Games

World Championship

World Cup
1977 – 11th place
1985 – 8th place
1995 – 11th place
2003 – 12th place
2007 – 10th place
2011 – 12th place
2015 – 10th place
2019 – 10th place

World Grand Champions Cup
2005 – 5th place
2009 – 6th place

World League
2006 – 13th place
2007 – 13th place
2008 – 13th place
2010 – 14th place
2015 – 21st place
2016 – 20th place
2017 – 24th place

Challenger Cup
2019 – 5th place

All-Africa Games
1965 –  Gold medal
1973 –  Gold medal
1991 –  Silver medal
1995 –  Gold medal
1999 –  Bronze medal
2003 –  Gold medal
2007 –  Gold medal
2011 – Did not entry
2015 –  Bronze medal
2019 –  Bronze medal

Mediterranean Games
1971 – 5th place
1975 – 6th place
1979 – 5th place
1983 – 5th place
2005 –  Gold medal
2022 – 8th place

European Championship
1955 – 14th place
1958 – 15th place

Team

Current squad
The following is the Egyptian roster in the 2022 World Championship.

Head coach:  Hassan Elhossary

Former squads
2003 FIVB World Cup — 12th place
Hamdy Awad El-Safi (c), Youssef Saleh, Mohamed Shehata, Ossama Kemsan, Wael El-Aydy, Ashraf El-Hassan, Mohamed Awad Eslam, Mohamed El-Mahdy, Mohamed Moselhy, Weal Said, Abdelnaeim Salah El-Dein, and Mahmoud Hassona. Head Coach: Veselin Vuković.
2005 Mediterranean Games — 1st place
Mahmoud Abdullah El-Kader, Ahmed Abdalla El-Naeim, Abdullah Alla Ahmed, Wael Al-Aydy, Hamdy Awad, Mohamed Badawy, Ossama Bekheit, Mahmoud El-Komy, Mohamed El-Mahdy, Mohamed El-Nafrawy, Mohamed El-Nasr, and Ayman Shwkry. Head Coach: Veselin Vuković.
2005 World Grand Champions Cup — 5th place
Hamdy Awad El-Safi (c), Ahmed Abdalla El-Salam, Ahmed El-Naeim, Ossama Bekheit, Wael El-Aydy, Youssef Saleh, Mohamed El-Mahdy, Mahmoud El-Komy, Mohamed El-Nafrawy, Mohamed Badawy, Mohamed El-Daabousi and Hossam Shaarawy. Head Coach: Ahmed Zakaria.
2006 FIVB World League — 13th place
Hamdy Awad El-Safi (c), Ahmed Abdalla El-Salam, Mohamed Gabl, Ahmed El-Naeim, Ossama Bekheit, Wael El-Aydy, Ashraf Abouel Hassan, Youssef Saleh, Mohamed El-Mahdy, Mahmoud El-Komy, Mohamed El Sayed, Hamdy Rashad,  Mohamed Badawy, Hossam Mostafa, Elian Aly Hussein, Mohamed Seif Al-Masr, Mahmoud Abdelkader, and Ahmed Awadalla. Head Coach: Grzegorz Rys.
2008 Summer Olympics — 11th place
Hamdy Awad, Abdalla Ahmed, abdallah abdelsalam, Mohamed Gabal, Ahmed Abdel Naeim, Abdel Latif Ahmed, Wael Al Aydy, Ashraf Abouelhassan, Saleh Youssef, Mohamed Badawy, Hossameldin Gomaa, Mohamed Seif Elnasr, and Mahmoud Abd El kader. Head Coach: Ahmed Zakaria.

See also
Volleyball at the 2000 Summer Olympics – Men's team rosters

References

External links
Official website
FIVB profile

Volleyball
National men's volleyball teams
Volleyball in Egypt
Men's sport in Egypt